Anne Fitzroy may refer to:

Anne Lennard, Countess of Sussex (1661-2 – 1721-2), daughter of Charles II and Barbara Villiers
Ann FitzRoy, Duchess of Grafton (1920 – 2021)